Piran Gushnasp, also known by his baptized name of Grigor, was an Iranian commander from the House of Mihran. In the early 6th century, he was appointed as the new governor (marzban) of Iberia. Between 540-542 he converted to Christianity, renouncing Zoroastrianism and assuming the Christian name of Grigor. However, this made his family boycott all contact with him, and he was soon executed in 542 at Peroz-Shapur due to apostasy. A companion of Piran, Yazd-panah, was also executed.

Sources 

 
 
 

House of Mihran
Converts to Christianity from Zoroastrianism
542 deaths
Sasanian governors of Iberia
People executed by the Sasanian Empire
Christians in the Sasanian Empire
6th-century Christian martyrs
6th-century Iranian people